Paris–Bourges is a French road bicycle race. The race originally started in Paris and ran to the town of Bourges in the Région Centre. The official name of the race is now Paris-Gien-Bourges although it is still referred to as Paris–Bourges on the UCI calendar and throughout much of the media.

The first race was run in 1913, and won by René Pichon and it has been an annual event since 1990. Since 1949, it has been for professionals, after previously being an amateur race. It is held as a 1.1 event in the UCI Europe Tour. It previously featured as the last of the French Road Cycling Cup series of races.

The Route
The modern version of the race takes place over a distance of approximately 190 km with the middle part climbing the hills of the Sancerrois region including the three classified climbs of the Cote de Jars (324 metres), Cote de Graveron (337 metres) and La Chapelotte (378 metres), these climbs decide the mountains prize. Because of their modest height and distance from the finish (La Chapelotte is 35 km from the finish), these hills very rarely have a decisive effect on the race. The race usually concludes with a bunch sprint on the Boulevard de la République in Bourges. Only two riders have won solo in recent editions and denied the sprinters, these were Thomas Voeckler (2006) and Florian Vachon in 2012.

Winners

References

External links 
  
 Velo-Club race page, primary source.

Cycle races in France
UCI Europe Tour races
Recurring sporting events established in 1913
1913 establishments in France